Asha Solette Philip (born 25 October 1990) is an English sprinter and former junior gymnast specialising in double mini-trampoline. She was the first British woman to achieve a global 100 metres title at any age-group, winning gold at the 2007 World Youth Championships aged 16. Following a serious knee injury in gymnastics, and a rehabilitation period of several years, she returned to athletics full-time in 2014, winning gold at the European Athletics Championships in the 4 x 100 metres relay for Great Britain, and bronze in the same event at the Commonwealth Games for England.

She won her first senior individual title in 2017, claiming gold at the 2017 European Athletics Indoor Championships 60 metres for women, and with Dina Asher-Smith, Desiree Henry and Daryll Neita formed part of the Great Britain 4 × 100 m relay squad which won an Olympic bronze medal in the 4 x 100 metres relay at the 2016 Rio Games. She also won silver medals in the same event at the 2017 and 2019 World Championships. A noted fast starter and 60 metre sprinter, Philip generally runs the first leg on relay duty.

Career
Philip had competed in double mini trampoline since aged 4. She was a World Junior Champion on double mini-trampoline, winning gold in the junior (15–16 years old) girls category in the world age competition in Eindhoven, Netherlands.

In July 2007, Philip won the World Youth Athletics Championships gold in the 100 metres, but shortly afterwards suffered a serious cruciate ligament injury representing Great Britain in the double-mini team event at the senior Trampoline World Championships in Quebec, Canada, which halted her sporting career entirely for three years. This ruled her out of a chance at selection for the 2008 Summer Olympics in Beijing, China.

On her return from injury, Philip completed solely in athletics, and was part of the Great Britain teams that won a silver medal in the 4 x 200 metres relay at the 2014 IAAF World Relays, and a gold medal in the 4 x 100 metres relay at the 2014 European Championships. In the same year, representing England, she won a bronze medal in the 4 x 100 metres relay and finished fourth in the 100 metres final at the 2014 Commonwealth Games.

In 2016, she competed at the Olympic Games in Rio. Philip reached the semi-finals of the 100 metres, but did not qualify for the finals. Philip then went on to win a bronze medal in the 4 x 100 metres relay, along with teammates Desiree Henry, Dina Asher-Smith and Daryll Neita. The quartet set a new British record with a time of 41.77 seconds.

Personal life
Born in Leyton, East London to an Antiguan father and a Jamaican mother, Philip attended Connaught School for Girls in Leytonstone. She graduated from Kingston University in 2012, with a BA (Hons) degree in drama.

References

External links
 
 
 
 
 
 
 

Living people
1990 births
People from Leyton
Athletes from London
British female trampolinists
English female sprinters
British female sprinters
Olympic female sprinters
Olympic athletes of Great Britain
Olympic bronze medallists for Great Britain
Olympic bronze medalists in athletics (track and field)
Athletes (track and field) at the 2016 Summer Olympics
Medalists at the 2016 Summer Olympics
Commonwealth Games gold medallists for England
Commonwealth Games bronze medallists for England
Commonwealth Games gold medallists in athletics
Commonwealth Games medallists in athletics
Athletes (track and field) at the 2014 Commonwealth Games
Athletes (track and field) at the 2018 Commonwealth Games
World Athletics Championships athletes for Great Britain
World Athletics Championships medalists
World Youth Championships in Athletics winners
European Athletics Championships winners
European Athletics Championships medalists
European Athletics Indoor Championships winners
British Athletics Championships winners
Alumni of Kingston University
Black British sportswomen
English people of Antigua and Barbuda descent
English people of Jamaican descent
Athletes (track and field) at the 2020 Summer Olympics
Medalists at the 2020 Summer Olympics
Athletes (track and field) at the 2022 Commonwealth Games
Medallists at the 2022 Commonwealth Games